Aliabad-e Shur (also Romanized as ‘Alīābād-e Shūr) is a village in Qasabeh-ye Sharqi Rural District, in the Central District of Sabzevar County, Razavi Khorasan Province, Iran. At the 2006 census, its population was 506, in 154 families.

See also 

 List of cities, towns and villages in Razavi Khorasan Province

References 

Populated places in Sabzevar County